This is a list of moths of the family Notodontidae that are found in India. It also acts as an index to the species articles and forms part of the full List of moths of India.

Genus Antheua
 Antheua servula Drury
 Antheua exanthemata Moore

Genus Anticyra
 Anticyra combusta Walker

Genus Apela
 Apela divisa Walker

Genus Baradesaj
 Baradesaj lithosioides Moore

Genus Besaia
 Besaia rubiginea Walker

Genus Cerura
 Cerura liturata Walker
 Cerura wisei Swinhoe
 Cerura prasana Moore

Genus Chadisra
 Chadisra bipni-s Walker

Genus Cyphanta
 Cyphanta xanthochlora Walker
 Cyphanta chortochlora Hampson

Genus Dicranura
 Dicranura himalayana Moore
 Dicranura roestleri de Lattin, et al.

Genus Dudusa
 Dudusa sphingiformis Moore

Genus Euhampsonia
 Euhampsonia niveiceps (Walker, 1865)

Genus Fentonia
 Fentonia argentifera Moore
 Fentonia brunnea Moore
 Fentonia obliquiplaga Moore
 Fentonia ocypete Brem
 Fentonia tenebrosa Walker

Genus Gangarides
 Gangarides dharma Moore, 1865
 Gangarides rosea Walker

Genus Gargetta
 Gargetta costigera Walker
 Gargetta nagaensis Hampson
 Gargetta curvaria Hampson
 Gargetta ingens Walker
 Gargetta albimacula Hampson

Genus Gazalina
Gazalina apsara (Moore, 1859)
Gazalina transversa (Moore, 1879)

Genus Ginshachia
 Ginshachia gemmifera (Moore, 1877)

Genus Hapigia
 Hapigia obliqua Walker

Genus Harpyia
 Harpyia longipennis Walker
 Harpyia microsticta Hampson

Genus Hyperaeschra
 Hyperaeschra pallida Butler, 1880
 Hyperaeschra basistriga Moore
 Hyperaeschra tenebrosa Moore
 Hyperaeschra basalis Moore
 Hyperaeschra nigribasis Hampson
 Hyperaeschra dentata Hampson
 Hyperaeschra variegata Moore

Genus Ichthyura
 Ichthyura anachoreta Fabricius
 Ichthyura pallida Walker
 Ichthyura costicomma Hampson
 Ichthyura cupreata Butler
 Ichthyura restitura Walker
 Ichthyura undulata Hampson
 Ichthyura ferruginea Moore

Genus Liparopsis
 Liparopsis postalbida Hampson

Genus Lophopteryx
 Lophopteryx saturata Walker
 Lophopteryx atrofusa Hampson
 Lophopteryx flavistigma Moore
 Lophopteryx ferruginosa Moore

Genus Megaceramis
 Megaceramis lamprolepis Hampson

Genus Metasrhsilis
 Metasrhsilis disrupta Moore

Genus Neodrymonia
 Neodrymonia apicalis (Moore,1879)

Genus Niganda
 Niganda strigifascia Moore, 1879

Genus Norraca
 Norraca longipennis Moore

Genus Notodonta
 Notodonta albifascia Moore
 Notodonta gigantea Elwes
 Notodonta moorei Hampson
 Notodonta sikkima Moore
 Notodonta rufa Hampson

Genus Oleapa
 Oleapa latifascia Walker

Genus Phalera
 Phalera parivala Moore
 Phalera sangana Moore
 Phalera torpida Walker
 Phalera procera Felder
 Phalera raya Moore
 Phalera grotei Moore, 1859
 Phalera torpida Walker, 1865

Genus Pheosia
 Pheosia fasciata Moore
 Pheosia pulcherrima Moore
 Pheosia excurvata Hampson
 Pheosia sikkima Moore

Genus Phycidopsis
 Phycidopsis albovittata Hampson, 1893

Genus Pydna
 Pydna testacea Walker
 Pydna decurrens Moore
 Pydna longivitta Walker
 Pydna nana Swinhoe
 Pydna pallida Butler
 Pydna ochracea Moore
 Pydna galbana Stcinh
 Pydna metaphsea Walker
 Pydna eupatagia Hampson
 Pydna aurata Moore
 Pydna fasciata Moore
 Pydna sikkima Moore
 Pydna nigropimetfi Hampson
 Pydna nigrofasciata Hampson
 Pydna basistriga Moorec
 Pydna ferrifera Walker

Genus Rachia
 Rachia plumosa Moore
 Rachia striata Hampson

Genus Ramesa
 Ramesa tosta Walker, 1855
 Ramesa fuscipennis Hampson
 Ramesa divisa Moore
 Ramesa albistriga Moore

Genus Somera
 Somera viridifusca Walker
 Somera virens Dierl

Genus Spatalia
 Spatalia argentifera Walker
 Spatalia costalis Moore
 Spatalia argentata Moore
 Spatalia albifasciata Hampson
 Spatalia auritractata Moore
 Spatalia plusioides Moore

Genus Stauropus
 Stauropus maculatus Moore
 Stauropus alternus Walker
 Stauropus sikkimensis Moore
 Stauropus dentilinea Hampson
 Stauropus apicalis Moore
 Stauropus viridescens Walker
 Stauropus pallidifascia Hampson
 Stauropus albivertex Hampson
 Stauropus fasciatus Moore
 Stauropus griseus Hampson
 Stauropus orliit
 Stauropus basiniger Moore
 Stauropus vinaceus Moore
 Stauropus plagiviridis Moore

Genus Syntypistis
 Syntypistis umbrosa Matsumura, 1927

Genus Tarsolepis
 Tarsolepis fulgurifera Walker
 Tarsolepis remicauda Butler: this is Tarsolepis sommeri Huebner see G.F. Hampson (1896) Fauna of British India Vol. 4, p. 453.

Genus Teleclita
Teleclita grisea (Swinhoe, 1892)
Teleclita strigata (Moore 1879)

Genus Turnaca
 Turnaca acuta Walker

Genus Zana
 Zana lignosa Walker

Genus Zaranga
 Zaranga pannosa Moore

See also
Notodontidae
Moths
Lepidoptera
List of moths of India

References
 Hampson, G.F. et al. (1892-1937) Fauna of British India Including Ceylon and Burma - Moths. Vols. 1-5 cxix + 2813 p - 1295 figs - 1 table - 15 pl (12 in col.)
 Kendrick, R.C. 2007. Hong Kong Moth Recorder. (unpublished database prepared by C&R Wildlife, Tai Po Hong Kong, accessed 3 July 2007).
 Savela, Markku. Website on Lepidoptera and Some Other Life Forms - page on family Notodontidae (Accessed on 8 July 2007).

 
x
M